Basile Ikouébé (born 1 July 1946 in Congo-Brazzaville) is a Retired Congolese diplomat (raised to the dignity of Ambassador of  the Republic of the Congo by presidential decree of January 20, 2021), Special representative of the President of the African Union Commission for the Great Lakes region, Head of the Liaison Office for Burundi since October 2017.

Diplomatic career
Previously, he held the following offices:

-  Minister of Foreign Affairs and Cooperation (2007 - 2015);

-  Ambassador, Permanent Representative of Congo to the United Nations   

  in New York (1998 - 2007);

-  Permanent Secretary of the Ministry of Foreign Affairs (1996 - 1998);

-  Itinerant Ambassador (1994 - 1996);

-  Diplomatic Advisor, then, cumulatively; Minister-Chief of Cabinet of the  

  President of the Republic (1982 – 1992);

-  Permanent Secretary, Ministry of Foreign Affairs (1977 - 1979);

-  Chief of Staff, Ministry of Foreign Affairs (1975 - 1977).

Higher studies in Modern Literature, political science and international relations in Brazzaville, Bordeaux and Paris.

Married, father of 6 children.

Several decorations in the Congo and abroad.

See also
Foreign relations of the Republic of the Congo

References

1946 births
Living people
Foreign Ministers of the Republic of the Congo
Republic of the Congo diplomats
Permanent Representatives of the Republic of the Congo to the United Nations
Government ministers of the Republic of the Congo
Congolese Party of Labour politicians